Valiant Swart (born Pierre Nolte, 25 November 1965), is a South African musician, Afrikaans folk rock singer-songwriter, and actor from Wellington.

Career
Born in Wellington, he resided in Stellenbosch. In 1977, at 11 years old, Valiant was given a guitar by his father and taught himself to play songs from artists like George Baker and Joe Dolan. Two years later he owned his first electric guitar. He writes and sings in both English and Afrikaans. The work that was begun by artists like Anton Goosen and, later, Koos Kombuis was continued by Swart.

He has released a great number of albums debuting in 1996 with the album Die Mystic Boer. In 2014, he released a collaboration with the South African rapper Jack Parow called Tema van jou lied.

Sonvanger
He is most famous for his song "Sonvanger" (meaning sun catcher) from his 2002 album Maanhare. He wrote the song after the tragic suicide of a young Afrikaans musician from Stellenbosch. Swart wrote it with the musician's mother in mind, longing for her lost son.

He adds in an interview: "The song has since taken on a life of its own; it seems to have brought comfort to a lot of bereaved people, which, to be honest, makes me feel real good."

The song has been covered multiple times notably by Corlea Botha, Jurie Els, Laurika Rauch, Karen Zoid, Theuns Jordaan and Refentse.

Discography

Albums
Die Mystic Boer (1996)
Dorpstraat Revisited (1996)
Kopskoot (1997)
Roekeloos (1998)
Deur die Donker Vallei (1999)
Boland Punk (2001)
Maanhare (2002)
Song vir Katryn (2003)
‘n Jaar in die son (with Koos Kombuis) (2003)
@ Jinx (with Mel Botes) (2004)
Mystic Myle (2005)
Horisontaal (2006)
Vuur en Vlam (with Ollie Viljoen) (2007)
Vrydagaand/Saterdagaand (2008)
Wild en Wakker (with Ollie Viljoen) (2010)
Nagrit (2015)

Singles
"Dis my Kruis" (1996)
"Boomtown hotel" (1996)
"Die skoene moet jy dra" (1996)
"Dis 'n honde lewe" (1997)
"Eldorado" (1997)
"Ware liefde" (1997)
"Eyeshadow" (1998)
"Roekeloos" (1998)
"Sonvanger" (2002)
"Matrooslied" (2002)
"Jakarandastraat" (2003)
"Liefde in die suburbs" (2003)
"Dans met my baby" (2003)
"Die sewe af" (2003)
"Lekker verby" (2003)
"Dad se vastrap" (2003)
"Horisontaal" (2006)
"Vaalhoed se baas" (2006)
"Spook en diesel" (2008)
"Heaven Hill blues" (2008)
"Tema van jou lied" (with Jack Parow) (2014)

DVDs
Live in die Staatsteater (2003)

Awards
Best Afrikaans Traditional Music Album (with Ollie Viljoen) - Vuur en Vlam: South African Music Awards 2008

References

Afrikaans-language singers
South African musicians
1965 births
Place of birth missing (living people)
Living people